Mordavella is a Gram-negative bacterial genus from the family of Clostridiaceae with one known species (Mordavella massiliensis). Mordavella massiliensis has been isolated from human feces

References

Clostridiaceae
Bacteria genera
Monotypic bacteria genera
Taxa described in 2017